The 2006 Rhythmic Gymnastics Asian Championships was held in Surat, India, 30 July – 3 August 2006.

Medal winners

Medal table

References 

Rhythmic Gymnastics Asian Championships
International gymnastics competitions hosted by India
2006 in gymnastics  
2006 in Indian sport